Brunström is a Swedish surname, written Brunstrom abroad. Notable people with this surname include:

 Carolina Brunström (1803–1855), Swedish ballerina
 Johan Brunström (born 1980), Swedish tennis player
 Richard Brunstrom (born 1954), British police officer
 Jane Carr (actress, born 1909), born Brunstrom

Swedish-language surnames